Christian Pierre Mathiesen (14 April 1870 – 8 August 1953) was a Norwegian landowner and politician for the Conservative Party.

Background
He was born in Kristiania (now Oslo), Norway, as the youngest son of landowner and industrialist Haaken C. Mathiesen. He finished his secondary education in 1888, graduated from the agricultural school at Sem in 1890 and also took agricultural education in Denmark. He was the owner of Linderud Manor  from 1893, while his oldest brother Haaken L. Mathiesen inherited the family company Mathiesen Eidsvold Værk. In 1940 he passed Linderud Manor down to his nephew, another Mathiesen Eidsvold Værk inheritor, Jørgen Mathiesen.

Career
Having many political positions in Aker, Mathiesen was elected to the Parliament of Norway in 1900 from the constituency Akershus Amt. He served one term. On 22 October 1903, when the Hagerup's Second Cabinet assumed office, he was appointed as the new Minister of Agriculture. He lasted until 25 September 1904, when he was replaced by Johan Egeberg Mellbye.
He was also the chairman of Fællesslagteriet from 1911 to 1936, Akers Sparebank from 1918 to 1945, Fellesbanken from 1921 to 1928 as well as Forsikringsselskapet Norden. He was a supervisory council member of the Royal Norwegian Society for Development.

Personal life
He was married to Celina Ihlen (1874–1948), a daughter of Conservative Party co-founder Jacob Thurmann Ihlen and his Belgian wife Ambrosine Rouquet. They had the son Haaken C. Mathiesen, Jr. Christian Pierre Mathiesen was decorated as a Knight, First Class of the Order of St. Olav and Commander, First Class of the Order of the Dannebrog. He died in 1953.

References

1870 births
1953 deaths
Politicians from Aker
Members of the Storting
Ministers of Agriculture and Food of Norway
Conservative Party (Norway) politicians
Commanders First Class of the Order of the Dannebrog
Recipients of the St. Olav's Medal